Stenoptilia lucasi is a moth of the family Pterophoridae. It is found in Greece, Cyprus, Turkey and Iran.

References

lucasi
Moths described in 1990
Plume moths of Asia
Plume moths of Europe
Taxa named by Ernst Arenberger